is a station in Izumo, Shimane Prefecture, Japan.

Lines
 West Japan Railway Company (JR West)
 San'in Main Line

Layout
The station has a simple island style platform layout.

History 
It was renamed to its present name on 18 April 1990.

Adjacent stations
West Japan Railway Company (JR West)

References 

Railway stations in Japan opened in 1913
Railway stations in Shimane Prefecture
Sanin Main Line